Saraband of Lost Time is a science fiction novel by American writer Richard Grant, published by Avon Books in 1985.  It is his first novel.  Saraband of Lost Time placed eighth in the annual Locus magazine poll for best first novel, and received a special citation from the Philip K. Dick Award judges.

Plot summary
The story takes place in thirty-five chapters.  The characters come from a variety of locations, and travel across the land in their adventures.  Grant created his own place names, drinks, songs and more for this novel.  Unlike many fantasy novels, he did not create a map of the world, which is supposedly a futuristic Earth after the occurrence of an apocalypse of some kind.  It may or may not be the same world as used in Rumors of Spring and Through the Heart.  The characters are still human and are not a great deal different from modern humans in most cases.  In all three books, the humans are mostly dealing with major environmental changes and the resulting changes in humanity, but some people have stood out as different.

Reception
Algis Budrys found Saraband of Lost Time to be "one of the most engaging first novels in years," praising the novel as "a piece of cultured prose which by its nature confers importance on its cast of characters and on their activities," but faulting Grant's failure to provide an understandable "pattern [for] the rather fragmented events taking place at the story's close."

Dave Langford, reviewing Saraband of Lost Time for White Dwarf #93, compared it to A Storm of Wings, stating that "Critics prefer Storm'''s literary echoes and clever bits; but for all its excessive length, more readers are likely to finish Saraband''."

References

External links 

1985 American novels
1985 science fiction novels
American science fiction novels
Debut science fiction novels
1985 debut novels
Avon (publisher) books